The girls' singles tournament of the 2022 European Junior Badminton Championships was held from 22 to 27 August. Anastasiia Shapovalova from Russia clinched this title in the last edition.

Seeds 
Seeds were announced on 5 August.

  Polina Buhrova 
  Luis Rodríguez 
  Émilie Drouin 
  Lucie Amiguet 
  Lisa Curtin 
  Gianna Stiglich 
  Lucie Krulová 
  Sophie Noble 

  Petra Maixnerová 
  Kaloyana Nalbantova 
  Mihaela Chepisheva 
  Antonia Schaller 
  Benedicte Sillassen 
  Nikol Carulla 
  Špela Alič 
  Selin Hübsch

Draw

Finals

Top half

Section 1

Section 2

Section 3

Section 4

Bottom half

Section 5

Section 6

Section 7

Section 8

References

External links 
Draw

2022 European Junior Badminton Championships